Summer Landscape with Harvesters is an oil on canvas painting by Flemish artists Joos de Momper and Jan Brueghel the Elder. It was painted in the first quarter of the 17th century, probably around 1610, and is currently housed at the Museum of Art in Toledo, Ohio. After having been exposed in Toledo as an "anonymous loan," the Museum directory opted for the purchase, influenced by the reaction of the public. The painting was acquired by the Toledo Museum of Art in 2003.

Summer Landscape with Harvesters might be part of one of the series dedicated to the four seasons started by de Momper in 1615, of which Landscape with Skaters is part.

Painting
The picture is an earthy depiction of nature and humanity, both at ease and engaged in physical exertion. Some people are working hard in the fields, others are having a picnic, others still are in the middle of a romantic encounter. Over seventy figures are depicted in the painting, and their activities reveal a cohesive and studied narrative. Some farmers are cutting off the grain, while others roll it into sheaves. Wagons are carrying the harvest to town, where it will be shipped to overseas markets, as indicated by the ships sailing in the faraway sea.

To the left, people are relaxing in the shade of the crop. They are eating food and drinking at a picnic. On the road, a dog greets a man walking up in front of his empty wagon to the viewer, and a woman sets the basket she is carrying on the ground, to rest a while on her way home.

The painting is a large vista of fields that recede to the background, giving way to a gulf and the ocean. By using a "mutually reinforcing geometry of diagonals that intersect with three distinct color bands [yellow, green, blue]," de Momper allowed his composition to "convincingly lead the eye deep into the picture."

Summer Landscape with Harvesters is considered one of many collaborations between de Momper of Jan Brueghel the Elder. The two collaborated on several occasions, with de Momper always painting the landscape and Brueghel taking care of the staffage, usually the animated figures.

Provenance
The painting was acquired by the Toledo Museum of Art in March 2003 at an yearly old master fair in Maastricht. The painting previously was part of private collections in Spain, and was possibly part of the collection decorating the Torre de la Reina in the Alcázar de Madrid, which reached Madrid from Flanders in the early 17th century.

References

Bibliography
 Toledo Museum of Art, Toledo Museum of Art Masterworks, Toledo, 2009, p. 154-55, repr. (col.) and (det.).
 Brueghel Family: Jan Brueghel the Elder. The Brueghel Family Database. University of California, Berkeley, 2016
 Jan Brueghel der Ältere (1568-1625): Kritischer Katalog der Gemälde. Ertz Klaus, 2008-10, cat. #745

External links
Painting at the Toledo Museum of Art

1610s paintings
Paintings of the Museo del Prado by Flemish artists
Landscape paintings
Paintings by Joos de Momper
Paintings by Jan Brueghel the Elder
Paintings in Ohio
Paintings in the United States
Paintings in Toledo, Ohio
Paintings in the collection of the Toledo Museum of Art